Grambling State University (GSU, Grambling, or Grambling State) is a public historically black university in Grambling, Louisiana. Grambling State is home of the Eddie G. Robinson Museum and is listed on the Louisiana African American Heritage Trail. Grambling State is a member-school of the University of Louisiana System and Thurgood Marshall College Fund.

Grambling State's athletic teams compete in Division I of the National Collegiate Athletic Association and are known as the Grambling State Tigers. Grambling State is a member of the Southwestern Athletic Conference.

History

Grambling State University developed from the desire of African-American farmers in rural north Louisiana who wanted to educate other African Americans. In 1896, the North Louisiana Colored Agriculture Relief Association led by Lafayette Richmond was formed to organize and operate a school. After opening a small school west of what is now the town of Grambling, the Association requested assistance from Booker T. Washington of Tuskegee Institute in Alabama. Charles P. Adams, sent to aid the group in organizing an industrial school, became its founder and first president.

Under Adams' leadership, the Colored Industrial and Agricultural School opened on November 1, 1901. Four years later, the school moved to its present location and was renamed as the North Louisiana Agricultural and Industrial School. By 1928, the school was able to offer two-year professional certificates and diplomas after becoming a state junior college. The school was renamed Louisiana Negro Normal and Industrial Institute.

In 1936, the program was reorganized to emphasize rural education. It became known as "The Louisiana Plan" or "A Venture in Rural Teacher Education." Professional teaching certificates were awarded when a third year was added in 1936, and the first baccalaureate degree was awarded in 1944 in elementary education. The institution's name was changed to Grambling College in 1946 in honor of a white sawmill owner, P. G. Grambling, who donated a parcel of land for the school. Thereafter, the college prepared secondary teachers and added curricula in sciences, liberal arts and business. With these programs in effect, the school was transformed from a single purpose institution of teacher education into a multi-purpose college.

In 1949, the college was accredited by the Southern Association of Colleges and Schools (SACS). The Grambling science building is one of twenty-six public structures in Louisiana constructed by the prominent contractor George A. Caldwell, who completed major public buildings throughout the state. In 1974, the addition of graduate programs in early childhood and elementary education allowed the college to be granted university status under its present name, Grambling State University.

From 1977 to 2000, the university grew and prospered. Several new academic programs were incorporated. New facilities were added to the  campus, including a business and computer science building, school of nursing, student services building, stadium, stadium support facility, and an intramural sports center.

State Representative George B. Holstead of Ruston, whose grandfather had been instrumental in the founding of Louisiana Tech, worked to increase state appropriations for both Louisiana Tech and Grambling State University during his legislative tenure from 1964 to 1980.

On December 7, 2010, the Grambling State University Historic District, an area comprising 16 buildings dating from 1939 to 1960, was added to the National Register of Historic Places.

In 2019, Grambling broke ground for building of the first digital library on a HBCU campus and first for a Louisiana collegiate institution.  The $16.6 million 50,000 square feet project is slated to be complete in the early 2020s.

Presidents 
Following the first President Charles P. Adams, Ralph Waldo Emerson Jones became the second president and baseball coach from 1936 until his retirement in 1977. Five presidents served from 1977 to 2001: Joseph Benjamin Johnson, Harold W. Lundy, Raymond Hicks, Leonard Haynes III, and Steve A. Favors.

Neari Francois Warner was selected as the university's first female president, when she served a three-year interim term. Horace Judson, who became the institution's seventh president in 2004, led the most ambitious 5-year campaign to rebuild the institution's facilities. He retired at the end of October 2009. That year Frank Pogue started as the institution's eighth president. On April 4, 2014, Pogue announced his retirement effective June 30, 2014. Cynthia S. Warrick became Grambling's second female president, serving a one-year interim term starting on July 1, 2014, and ending on July 1, 2015. Willie Larkin served as president from July 1, 2015, to July 1, 2016. The current and tenth president is GSU alumnus Richard J. Gallot, Jr.

Academics

Grambling State University offers undergraduate and graduate degrees through the following four colleges:
College of Art & Sciences
College of Business
College of Educational and Graduate Studies
College of Professional Studies
In addition, there is the Earl Lester Cole Honors College available for high-achieving undergraduate students seeking a more unique academic experience. Also an Army ROTC program is available for undergraduate students interested in a college curriculum with a military foundation.

Grambling State offers its only doctoral degree in Developmental Education through the College of Educational and Graduate Studies.

In 2020, Grambling became the first collegiate institution in Louisiana to offer bachelor's degrees in cybersecurity and cloud computing.

Grambling State is accredited by 18 separate accrediting associations, a member in good standing in 20 organizations, and accredited in all of the programs required by the Louisiana Board of Regents.

Student life

Athletics

The Grambling Tigers represent Grambling State University in NCAA intercollegiate athletics. Grambling's sports teams participate in NCAA Division I (Football Championship Subdivision for football) in the Southwestern Athletic Conference (SWAC). Currently, the Grambling State University Department of Athletics sponsors Men's Intercollegiate football, along with men's and women's basketball, baseball, track & field, softball, golf, soccer, tennis, bowling and volleyball.

Grambling State's most notable rivals are their south Louisiana foe Southern, Prairie View A&M, Jackson State, and Alcorn State.

Student body
, approximately 30% of GSU's student body is from outside Louisiana; Texas, California, and Illinois are the three largest feeder states. 60% of the student body is female, 40% is male. 91% of the student body identify as black, 9% identify as non-black.   GSU's student body of nearly 5,000 students is the second largest among HBCUs in Louisiana.

GSU Tiger Marching Band

The GSU Tiger Marching Band also known as "The World Famed Tiger Marching Band" is a historic marching band with many special accolades and accomplishments.  For example, they are the only HBCU marching band in the nation to perform at two consecutive U.S. presidential inaugurations. "World Famed" was founded in 1926 and serves as one of the premier ambassadors of the university.  One of the band's most anticipated traditions is the annual nationally televised "Battle of The Bands" against Southern University's Human Jukebox marching band during Bayou Classic weekend in the Superdome.  The yearly event attracts tens of thousands of alumni, fans, and spectators.

Campus media
The Gramblinite is the university's weekly student newspaper that is consistently awarded for excellent journalism.
 KGRM Tiger Radio 91.5 FM is a 24-hour student-run radio station that provides a variety of music, news, sports and public affairs programming. 
The GSU-TV Media Center is operated by the Department of Mass Communications to train students interested in broadcasting careers.

Gallery

Notable alumni

Alumni of Grambling State include numerous MLB, NBA and NFL players, public officials, lawyers, doctors, scholars, journalists, business professionals, and artists.

 NFL Hall of Famer Buck Buchanan of the Kansas City Chiefs
 Eight-time Mr. Olympia winner Ronnie Coleman
 Actress Natalie Desselle-Reid
 Grammy-winner Erykah Badu attended Grambling State University and once served as a campus queen. 
 New York Times columnist Charles M. Blow
 Super Bowl XXII MVP quarterback Doug Williams is not only an alumnus, but previously served as the Tigers' head football coach. 
 West coast Bay Area rap artist E-40
 Alumnus Ivory V. Nelson was named a Fulbright Scholar in 1966.  
 Alumnus Cedric Glover, now a state representative, was the first African-American mayor of Shreveport, Louisiana.  
 Alumna Ollie Tyler is the first African-American female mayor of Shreveport, Louisiana. 
 Stephanie A. Finley (B.S. 1988) is a United States Attorney and a President Barack Obama nominee for United States District Judge of the United States District Court for the Western District of Louisiana.  
 Bob French is a well-known jazz musician.
 Alumnus Paul (Tank) Younger is the first Black football player from a HBCU to sign a contract and play professional football. 
 Alumna Alma Dawson is a scholar of library and information science who held the Russell B. Long Professorship at Louisiana State University. 
 The writer Judi Ann Mason was a double major graduate of Grambling. She began her writing career at GSU by winning two major playwrighting awards through the American College Theatre Festival. 
 N. Burl Cain, former warden of Louisiana State Penitentiary, has a master's degree in criminal justice from Grambling.
Ernie Ladd was an American professional football player and a WWE Hall of Famer.
Willis Reed is an NBA Hall of Famer and member of the "50 Greatest Players in NBA History".

References

External links

 
Educational institutions established in 1901
Universities and colleges accredited by the Southern Association of Colleges and Schools
Louisiana African American Heritage Trail
Education in Lincoln Parish, Louisiana
Buildings and structures in Lincoln Parish, Louisiana
Tourist attractions in Lincoln Parish, Louisiana
Grambling, Louisiana
1901 establishments in Louisiana
Public universities and colleges in Louisiana